Jason Baldwin (born 7 November 1969) is a former Australian rules footballer who played with Fitzroy and Richmond in the Australian Football League (AFL).

Baldwin, a recruit from Coldstream, was a regular fixture in the Fitzroy team throughout the 1990s but managed just two games at Richmond, which secured him at pick 63 in the 1996 National Draft.

He now works for a scaffolding business in Dandenong.

References

External links
 
 

1969 births
Australian rules footballers from Victoria (Australia)
Fitzroy Football Club players
Richmond Football Club players
Living people